Cryptorama is a genus of death-watch and spider beetles in the family Ptinidae. There are more than 20 described species in Cryptorama.

Species
These 28 species belong to the genus Cryptorama:

 Cryptorama antillensis White, 1984
 Cryptorama carinatum White
 Cryptorama concavum White
 Cryptorama confusum White
 Cryptorama crepusculum White
 Cryptorama densipunctatum Fisher
 Cryptorama densum White
 Cryptorama dufaui (Pic, 1909)
 Cryptorama fuliginosum White
 Cryptorama griseum White
 Cryptorama grossum White
 Cryptorama guatemalensis White
 Cryptorama holosericeum (LeConte, 1878)
 Cryptorama impunctatum White
 Cryptorama lividum White
 Cryptorama megalops White
 Cryptorama minutum (LeConte, 1878)
 Cryptorama oblongum Fall, 1905
 Cryptorama panamensis White
 Cryptorama parvum White
 Cryptorama punctatum White
 Cryptorama rufescens White
 Cryptorama sericeum (Pic, 1909)
 Cryptorama sparsum White
 Cryptorama texanum White
 Cryptorama tortolensis White
 Cryptorama unistriatum White
 Cryptorama vorticale Fall, 1905

References

Further reading

 
 
 

Bostrichoidea
Articles created by Qbugbot